Laura Kate Blakeman (born 25 April 1979 in Stoke-on-Trent) is a British slalom canoeist who competed at the international level from 1995 to 2011.

She won five medals in the K1 team event at the ICF Canoe Slalom World Championships with a gold (2009), a silver (2005) and three bronzes (2002, 2003, 2007). She won another four medals in the same event at the European Championships (1 gold, 1 silver and 2 bronzes).

Blakeman finished 12th in the K1 event at the 2000 Summer Olympics in Sydney.

References

12 September 2009 results of the women's K1 team finals at the 2009 ICF Canoe Slalom World Championships. - Retrieved 12 September 2009.

1979 births
English female canoeists
Canoeists at the 2000 Summer Olympics
Living people
Olympic canoeists of Great Britain
British female canoeists
Sportspeople from Stoke-on-Trent
Medalists at the ICF Canoe Slalom World Championships